N. Nalaka Bandara Kottegoda (born 14 September 1979) is a Sri Lankan engineer, politician and Member of Parliament.

Kottegoda was born on 14 September 1979. He is a member of Viyathmaga (Path of the Learned), a pro-Rajapaksa, nationalist group of academics, businesspeople and professionals. He contested the 2020 parliamentary election as a Sri Lanka People's Freedom Alliance electoral alliance candidate in Matale District and was elected to the Parliament of Sri Lanka.

References

1979 births
Living people
Members of the 16th Parliament of Sri Lanka
Sinhalese engineers
Sinhalese politicians
Sri Lankan Buddhists
Sri Lanka People's Freedom Alliance politicians
Sri Lanka Podujana Peramuna politicians